Mandi Ballinger is an American politician from Georgia. Ballinger is a Republican member of Georgia House of Representatives for District 23.

References

Republican Party members of the Georgia House of Representatives
21st-century American politicians
Living people
21st-century American women politicians
Women state legislators in Georgia (U.S. state)
1975 births